Polygrammodes fluminalis is a moth in the family Crambidae. It was described by Arthur Gardiner Butler in 1883. It is found in Fiji.

References

Spilomelinae
Moths described in 1883
Moths of Fiji